Jeffrey Locker (died 2009) was an American self-help author and motivational speaker.

Death and aftermath
In 2009, Locker hired Kenneth Minor to kill him so his family would collect $18 million in insurance benefits. Minor claimed that Locker, a married father of three from Long Island, hired him to "do a Kevorkian", help him to commit suicide. Locker was found dead in his car, in East Harlem, bound and stabbed.

Longtime Allegheny County Medical Examiner Dr. Cyril Wecht testified as a defense expert on behalf of Minor.

Minor was sentenced to 20 years to life for the murder of Locker. Minor is appealing his conviction. In October 2014, his sentence was reduced to 12 years.

Eventually Federal Judge William Kuntz ruled that the $4 million policy issued by Principal Life Insurance should be voided because Locker had substantially misstated his annual income as $800,000 when, in truth, his gross income at the time was no more than $225,000 and he was deeply in debt.

References

External links
 CBS – 48 Hours – Death Wish – Sept. 7, 2013

Year of birth missing
American self-help writers
2009 deaths